Vua Tiếng Việt (English: King of Vietnamese) is a Vietnamese television quiz show featuring Vietnamese vocabulary and language, which uses methods from Vietnamese vernacular and folk songs, but at the same time strives to keep factual consistency. The program is aired on 8:30 pm every Friday on VTV3, starting from September 10, 2021, and is hosted by Nguyễn Xuân Bắc.

Format 
The format of the program sees 4 players participating in every episode, where they have to go through a total of 4 rounds. After each round, the person who has the lowest score will be eliminated from the game. The scores will be refreshed to 0 through the next rounds.

Starting from episode 2 (September 17, 2021), the questions in an episode will mostly revolve around the main theme of that episode.

Round 1: Reflex 
Each player has 90 seconds to answer a pack of 13 questions with different requirements (examples of requirements include, 'choose the correctly spelled word,' 'match the letters into a word/phrase,' 'count the number of nouns/verbs/ adjectives in a sentence,' 'write the correct word,' 'fill in the word in a folk song/proverb,' 'fill in a word in the word,' 'identify the letter,...'). Players get 1 point for each correct answer. They are able to pass any question, but incorrect answers will not be awarded points, and cannot be returned; if the player has time, but has run out of questions, the host will ask the questions that the player skipped before. The player's part will end when time runs out or when all the questions have been answered.

In each turn, when required, the stage lights will run around randomly to select a player.

If 2 or more players have the same lowest score, additional questions will be asked (according to the gameplay of the Reflex round, there is no time limit but no scoring) to determine the winner. The player who answers correctly will advance to round 2. This will repeat until there is only 1 player left, and this player will be eliminated. The number of sub-questions is equal to the number of candidates to participate minus 1.

Round 2: Explain 
3 players who pass Round 1 will take turns to perform the following roles: one person describes a word chosen by the host, and the other two players guess. Each player has two turns, after every two words, the description will be passed to the next player. The 'describer' will have 60 seconds to describe the requested word (body language is not allowed), and the remaining two people will hit the button to win the right to answer. If the answer is wrong, the clock will continue and the describer continues to describe from above until the time runs out or someone answers correctly, then the clock will stop and both the describer and the person who answered correctly will get some points as follows:

 Correct answer in 0 to 15 seconds: 4 points
 Correct answer in 16 to 30 seconds: 3 points
 Correct answer in 31 to 45 seconds: 2 points
 Correct answer in 46 to 60 seconds: 1 point
 After 60th second: 0 point

It is illegal for the describer to speak out any part of the requested word, and the word will be passed. After 6 words (without breaking the rules), the player with the lowest score in this round will be disqualified.

In case there are 2 players with the same score and the lowest score, an extra word will be given and explained by the other player (no time limit and score) to determine the 2 players to go on.

Round 3: Strings 
An artist after performing in the show will bring a secret message. Inside is a question that the MC will ask the players at a certain time (usually, this question will be part of the answer). in the artist's song, and is on verse 5 or 6).

In this round, 2 players will arrange 9 sentences from jumbled words to form correct and meaningful sentences, each question has 30 seconds to answer. The player hits the button first to win the right to answer; the correct answer will be awarded 1 point. The game will end in one of the following four situations:

 Players who get 5 correct answers first win immediately;
 No one gets 5 correct answers after 9 questions, then the person with more points (e.g. 3 - 2, 4 - 3,...) will win;
 A player leads by a number of points that the opponent cannot equalize on the remaining questions (e.g.: A gets 4 points and B gets 1 point after 7 questions, A wins as B can only add up to 2 points );
 The score is tied after 9 questions, there will be 1 sub-question (which is also a sequence of words; no time limit and no points), who answers this question correctly first will win.

In the end, the winner will advance to the Usurpation round, the rest will be eliminated.

Round 4: Usurpation 
Candidates for round 4 will answer 3 questions, with the following content in turn:

Season 1 
 Question 1: Find 2 words that are synonyms (close in meaning) or opposite in meaning to the given word.
 Question 2: Find 3 words that are antonyms or synonyms (close in meaning) to the given word.
 Question 3: Make a poem with 4 lines in length according to the verse form chosen at random and in which there must be a given keyword. The player chooses the poetic form by drawing lots; from episode 8 (October 29, 2021) to episode 18 (January 7, 2022) is spinning a wheel in which there are 2 special spaces (increasing the prize by 5 million VND and adding 30 seconds of thinking). When spinning (drawing) into one of the two special spaces, the contestant will receive the corresponding perks and need to return until hitting one of the certain poetic forms.

The questions in this round are all assessed by the advisory board. At least, 2 advisory committee members are required to agree for an answer/poem to be accepted. In some cases (in the first 2 questions), an answer may not be approved by the advisory board but still be counted due to matching the corresponding definition in the program's dictionary.

The contestant have 30 seconds to answer each question; they must answer correctly the previous question correctly to answer the next one. If you answer any question incorrectly, the game will be over. If you pass sentence 3, that player will become the "King of Vietnamese" of the week and receive 30 million VND. This person will then be faced with 2 choices: either stop the game to bring back the money they have (If they stop at the 60 million or 90 million mark, the player will give the ring) or wear the 'challenging' green ring and sit on the "throne" to challenge other players next week and have a chance to increase the prize money.

When someone is on the "throne", the rules of the game will change: both the challenger and the defending champion will compete (the person who is in the position from the previous episode will only compete in this round in the next episode, before that there will be 4 new contestants)).

 In the first question, the challenger's answer is checked first.
 In the second question, the incumbent's answer is checked first.
 In the third question, each person (challenging and standing) will make a separate poem, in the form of a poem drawn by MC Xuan Bac. The Advisory Committee will evaluate each poem to decide the winner (If the Advisory Committee does not accept both, another keyword will be given and both people must write 1 more poem, also in the case of accepting both poems, the advisory board will choose the final winner. If the advisory board only accepts one poem, the person approved by the advisory board will win).

In the event that the defending champion fails, they will lose all their prize money and have to return the ring to the program. At this time, the program will continue, the challenger will have to solve the remaining questions to win the position of "King of Vietnamese". If successful, the challenger will receive 30 million VND and stand in front of 2 options as above.

If the challenger fails, the game is over and the defending champion wins immediately and gets an increased prize. At this time, the incumbent will also face the same 2 options as above (in week 4, if the incumbent wins, the incumbent will leave with 180 million).

If both the challenger and the challenger answer correctly, both will continue to play until the challenger fails or reaches question 3, at which point the advisory board will decide the winner.

Season 2

How to answer 
In each question, the answers are given after the thinking time has expired. However, the player can also reply immediately while the time is still running (this is not generally applicable). The answers given often need to be pre-written on the player's draft page.

In the first two sentences, the player can write more answers than required (5 words maximum), as long as there are enough correct answers. For question 3, they need to write down at least the first and last words of each verse (no need to memorize the poem).

Payout structure 
Player's prize money starts at VND 40 million (30 million in season 1). If the usurper wins the 4th round but does not receive this bonus and continues to return to the show, he/she will have to accept the next week's challenge to increase the available amount, and so on until the 4th week with the highest prize of 320 million VND (180 million in season 1). Below is the prize money players will win if they pass round 4. The more times they pass this round, the higher the amount they win. Receiving 320 million VND, players will also permanently own the challenge ring.

Advisory board 
Each episode has the appearance of 3 members of the advisory board. In addition to the task of grading questions for the usurpation round, they also regularly provide explanations for some content (words, poems...) appearing in the program.

 Assoc. Prof. Dr. Pham Van Tinh - General Secretary of the Vietnam Association of Linguistics
 Doctor of Science in Literature Doan Huong
 Writer and journalist Hoang Anh Tu
 Journalist Nguyen Nhu Mai
 Writer Di Ly
 Master of Literature Researcher Ngo Huong Giang
 Doctor of Literature Do Thanh Nga
 Journalist Phan Dang
 Doctor of Linguistics Do Anh Vu
 Writer Truong Quy
 Poet Lu Mai
 Poet Huu Viet

Reach the throne 
This is a list of contestants that have ever won the show. The ultimate winning players (180 million VND in season 1, 320 million VND from season 2 on) are bolded, both their name and the amount of the prize. Contestants who receive 90 million VND or less are recorded with the same amount of winnings they have. If the incumbent is usurped, the prize they currently have before being usurped will be crossed out.

Reception 
Thanks to the novel content about the language, along with the combination of entertainment and knowledge of Vietnamese, King of Vietnamese is a program that creates attraction for the audience. In the program, players have to overcome questions related to Vietnamese grammar and words, and at the same time are challenged to react quickly. Many topics in the program, especially combining words into words, were widely shared and enthusiastically responded by many netizens. Many comments from the audience said that the richness and diversity of Vietnamese made them scratch their heads and solve puzzles.

According to Kantar Media's statistics based on the viewership rate measured in 4 major cities, Ha Noi, Ho Chi Minh City, Da Nang and Can Tho, the show is listed in the top 10 watched TV shows in September 2021, October 2021, November 2021, and December 2021. Many viewers have also signed up to join the program to try their hand at Vietnamese, which proves the show's great appeal to television audiences.

Ratings 
Source: Kantar Media, according to data on 10 TV shows with the highest ratings in the month, statistics in 4 big cities (Hanoi, Da Nang, Ho Chi Minh City and Can Tho).

Changes 

 From October 29, 2021, the draw box for poetry in round 4 will be replaced by a multicolored vertical wheel.
 From November 5, 2021, the show will start welcoming the audience into the studio, when the COVID-19 epidemic in Hanoi is under control.
 From January 14, 2022, the draw box for poetry in round 4 will be reused, and the audience will not be allowed to enter the studio due to the outbreak of COVID-19 in Hanoi again.

Broadcasting

Main broadcast 

 September 10, 2021 - now: Friday 20:30

Replay 

 On VTV3: 04:30 on Mondays, 08:50 on Saturdays (Episode 1 reruns on January 8, 2022) and 03:00 on Sundays
 On VTV4: Tuesday 14:15, Wednesday and Sunday 18:15
 On VTV5
 On VTV5 Southwest: 03:15 on Saturday and 21:15 on Sunday
 On VTV5 Central Highlands: Thursday 20:30
 On VTV's digital platforms

Broadcast pause 
During the broadcast, there were several times when the show halted or changed the recording and broadcast as planned, mostly due to coincident with special events. The postponed shows were back on air the following week. Specifically:

 On February 4, 2022, and February 11, 2022, the program temporarily stopped broadcasting to spend time on the program during the Lunar New Year.
 After the March 4, 2022 broadcast, the show will end its first season and plan a second season. The second season premiered on September 23, 2022.
 On December 16, 2022 and December 23, 2022, the program is expected to temporarily stop broadcasting to make room for the art program Young Aspiration 13 and the national finale of the Miss Vietnam 2022 contest.

See more 

 List of television programs broadcast by Vietnam Television (VTV)
 Vietnamese language

References

External links 

 

Vietnam Television original programming
Vietnamese television shows